Daniel & Ana is a 2009 Mexican drama-thriller film directed by Michel Franco. It had its world premiere on May 18, 2009 at the Cannes Film Festival and stars Darío Yazbek Bernal and Marimar Vega. The movie follows two siblings that are kidnapped and forced to have sex on camera, as well as the emotional trauma that follows afterwards.

Plot
Daniel and Ana live with their wealthy parents in Mexico City. He has a girlfriend, Mariana, while she is soon to be married to Rafa, who wants to take a job in Spain. The two are kidnapped at gunpoint and, under threat of being raped and killed, are filmed stripping and having sex. Though returned home unharmed, their lives are shattered: they cannot talk to each other or to anybody else.

In time Ana proves more resilient, consulting a psychiatrist and reconciling with Rafa. But Daniel's emotional state remains in turmoil, because he was not wholly repulsed by sex with the attractive older sister he has always loved. He buys a dagger to take to Ana's wedding, but is unsure who to kill.

A message at the end of the film warns against pornography using coerced amateurs.

Cast
Darío Yazbek Bernal as Daniel Torres
Marimar Vega as Ana Torres
José María Torre as Rafa  
Franco Abisua as Agrupación Cariño
Cecilia Franco Abruch as Amiga Boda
José de Jesús Aguilar as Sacerdote
Gary Alazraki as Amigo Borracho
Mark Alazraki as Amigo Fiesta
Elías Alfille as Borracho 1
Irma Berlanga as Recepcionista
José Luis Caballaro as Amigo Boda
Jéssica Castelán as Mariana
Gabriel de Cervantes as Secuestrador 3
Cecilia Levy Franco as Amiga Boda
Sara Levy Franco as Niña Boda

Production
Marimar Vega said that before going to talk with director Michel Franco, "There were some nerves about the nudity that had to be done, but when I talked to him and he explained how he was going to work with me, how he was going to take it, they went away."

Reception
Critical reception for Daniel & Ana was mixed  and the film holds a rating of 50% on Rotten Tomatoes (based on 6 reviews) and 43 on Metacritic (based on 5 reviews). The New York Times gave a mixed review, stating that while the film's "stylistic restraint may help deflect accusations of exploitation", they also thought that the muted emotions in the film "impedes our connection with the victims". The Village Voice also gave a mixed review, saying that the film was effective until the final act which they felt "tips the film's delicate balance over into lurid grotesquerie, even as [Franco's] staging remains as consciously muted as ever."

References

External links

2000s Spanish-language films
2009 thriller drama films
Mexican independent films
2009 independent films
Mexican thriller drama films
Films about rape
Incest in film
Films directed by Michel Franco
2009 directorial debut films
2009 drama films
2000s Mexican films